German minesweeper M-1 was a M 1935-class minesweeper of Nazi Germany's Kriegsmarine in World War II.

History
Laid down in 1936, M-1 was launched on 5 March 1937. Commissioned on 1 September 1938 under the command of Oberleutnant zur See Hans Bartels, she was used to transfer the Marinestosstruppkompanie to the battleship  on 24 August 1939 in preparation for the Invasion of Poland. After service in the campaign, M-1 was relocated to the North Sea.

In February 1940, M-1 sank four Esbjerg fish trawlers, Ejjam (E 92), Gerlis (E 456), Merkator (348), and Polaris (E 504), killing all 16 crew members. Bartels later justified his decision with military necessity, as the neutral fishermen allegedly send coded messages to alert British forces to his presence on the Doggerbank.

After the German attack on the Soviet Union, M-1 was part of the naval component of Operation Siegfried, the occupation of the islands Dagö, Ösel, and Moon. Soon afterwards, M-1 became flotilla leader of 55. Vorpostenflottille operating on the west coast of occupied Norway.

On 12 January 1945, M-1 was sunk in Nordbyfjord, near Bergen in Norway, by Avro Lancaster aircraft of 9 and 617 Squadrons, Royal Air Force, using Tallboy bombs. She sank with the loss of 20 crew members.

References

Citations

Bibliography

External links

1937 ships
Ships built in Hamburg
World War II minesweepers of Germany
Maritime incidents in January 1945
Ships sunk by British aircraft
Minesweepers sunk by aircraft
World War II shipwrecks in the North Sea